Lampione (Jazīrat al-Kitāb) is a small rocky island located in the Mediterranean Sea, which belongs geographically to the Pelagie Islands and administratively to the comune of Lampedusa e Linosa, Province of Agrigento, region of Sicily, Italy.

The islet is uninhabited, the only building being a lighthouse. According to the legend, the island was a rock that had fallen from the hands of the cyclops Polyphemus.

Lampione is part of the Riserva Marina Isole Pelagie, and its vegetation and wildlife are strictly protected. Animal species include the endemic Podarcis filfolensis ssp. laurentimulleri (also found on Linosa), which is a subspecies of Maltese wall lizard, numerous migrating birds, and the Armadillidium hirtum pelagicum, a land crustacean. The waters are populated by sharks, including the sandbar shark, groupers, lobsters, and varieties of yellow and pink coral.

See also
 List of islands of Italy
 Italy–Tunisia Delimitation Agreement
 Lampione Lighthouse

References

External links
History of Lampione, Italy

Uninhabited islands of Italy
Pelagie Islands
Lampedusa e Linosa
Islands of Africa